Harry Waller  (c. 1701–1772) was a British lawyer and Whig politician who sat in the House of Commons from 1726 to 1747.

Waller was the second son of Dr. Stephen Waller and his wife Judith Vernon, daughter of Sir Thomas Vernon MP of Farnham, Surrey. He was the younger brother of  Edmund Waller. He was admitted at Inner Temple in 1716 and was called to the bar in 1725. He also entered Lincoln's Inn in 1721.

At the 1722, Waller stood for Parliament at Wycombe, where his family had a major interest and also at St Ives but was unsuccessful at both. He stood for Wycombe at a by-election  on 1 February 1726, which was declared void after irregularities. After a second by-election on 3 March 1726, he was returned on petition as Member of Parliament for Wycombe on 17 March. The mayor responsible for the management of the elections was committed to Newgate as a result.  Waller was returned unopposed at the 1727, 1734 and   1741 general elections, and was returned with his brother Edmund in 1734 and after.

After the fall of Walpole in 1742, Waller followed his elder brother Edmund into opposition and voted consistently against the ministry. However, Edmund took office under the Government as Cofferer of the Household in 1744, whereupon Harry  was considered a  ‘New Ally’ for the Government.  Harry retained his seat until the 1747 general election, when he stood down in favour of his nephew, Edmund Waller junior.

Waller married Elizabeth Stapylton, daughter of Sir John Stapylton, 3rd Baronet on 4 August  1744, His nephew 
Edmund was appointed Master of  St. Katharine's Hospital and Waller himself was appointed  as deputy master under him in February 1747, a position he held for the rest of his life.

Waller died on 29 July 1772.

References

1700 births
1772 deaths
Members of the Parliament of Great Britain for English constituencies
British MPs 1722–1727
British MPs 1727–1734
British MPs 1734–1741
British MPs 1741–1747